is a former Japanese football player. She played for Japan national team, and competed at the 1996 Summer Olympics.

Club career
Handa was born in Shizuoka on May 10, 1965. She played for her local club Shimizudaihachi SC and Suzuyo Shimizu FC Lovely Ladies (formerly Shimizu FC Ladies). In 1989, at Shimizu FC Ladies, the club won championship in L.League first season. And she was named first MVP awards in the league. In 1993 season, she scored 14 goals and she became top scorer. She was selected Best Eleven 4 times (1989, 1990, 1993 and 1994).

National team career
In June 1981, when Handa was 16 years old, she selected Japan national team for 1981 AFC Championship. At this competition, on June 7, she debuted against Chinese Taipei. This match is Japan team first match in International A Match. On June 13, she scored a goal against Indonesia. This goal is Japan national team first goal in International A Match. And Japan won the match (1-0). This is Japan national team first victory. She also played at 1986, 1989, 1991, 1993, 1995 AFC Championship, 1990, 1994 Asian Games. She was a member of Japan for 1991, 1995 World Cup and 1996 Summer Olympics. She played 75 games and scored 19 goals for Japan until 1996.

National team statistics

References

External links

1965 births
Living people
Association football people from Shizuoka Prefecture
Japanese women's footballers
Japan women's international footballers
Nadeshiko League players
Shimizudaihachi Pleiades players
Suzuyo Shimizu FC Lovely Ladies players
Olympic footballers of Japan
Footballers at the 1996 Summer Olympics
Asian Games silver medalists for Japan
Asian Games medalists in football
Women's association football midfielders
Footballers at the 1990 Asian Games
Footballers at the 1994 Asian Games
Medalists at the 1990 Asian Games
Medalists at the 1994 Asian Games
1991 FIFA Women's World Cup players
1995 FIFA Women's World Cup players
Nadeshiko League MVPs